(LMPT) is a political organization in France which is responsible for most of the large demonstrations and actions in opposition to laws enabling same-sex marriage (better known as —Marriage for all) and adoption by same-sex couples in France.

Since the law was enacted in May 2013, the group's demands have remained the same: opposition to marriage and adoption by same-sex couples, to assisted reproductive technology in the absence of a father for the child, and to all forms of gestational surrogacy (including for male-female couples). The movement supports father-mother-child filiation and opposes "gender ideology" (successively named "théorie du gender", "théorie du genre" and "idéologie du genre" in French).

Described by Le Monde as bringing together numerous organizations, of which the main ones are almost all religious and mainly linked to Catholicism, and supported in its calls for public demonstrations by many members of the right wing and the far-right in France, the group identified itself as apolitical and non-denominational before it became a political party itself in April 2015. 
Internal divisions resulted in the successive departures of its founders Béatrice Bourges, Frigide Barjot, and Xavier Bongibault.

Founding and name 

The name La Manif pour tous  means "Protest for all" and was named after the French expression  ("marriage for all") which was the popular term used in France to promote same sex marriage, and also to refer to the Civil solidarity pact (PaCS), the 1999 French law permitting civil union between same-sex partners.

Goals and methods 

Some of the objectives of  include:
 demanding that the gay-marriage act be repealed,
 protesting against what they call the French government's "familyphobia",
 protesting against the government's alleged teaching of "gender theory" in French schools, or plans to impose sex education starting in kindergarten.

An organized group called for a boycott in 2014 involving pulling children from schools one day a month to protest against the alleged anti-family actions of the government.

Surrogacy is currently illegal in France for everyone; In vitro fertilization and other birth-assistive technology is available, but only to heterosexual couples. The government says it has no plans to change the situation, and Prime Minister Manuel Valls declared his opposition to surrogacy in all forms. Regarding "gender theory" or sex education in pre-schools the government says they are false rumors created on purpose by conservatives with ties to far-right groups.

Criticism 
 has been criticized as homophobic and using children to make a political point.

See also 

 Anti-gender movement
 Catholic Church and homosexuality
 Catholic Church in France
 Christian views on marriage
 Civitas (movement)
 Coalition pour la vie et la famille
 Feminism in France
 Gender roles in Christianity
 Human rights in France
 Intersex rights in France
 LGBT adoption in Europe
 LGBT culture in Paris
 LGBT history in France
 LGBT rights in Europe
 LGBT rights in France
 LGBT rights in the European Union
 List of Christian denominational positions on homosexuality
 Marriage in the Catholic Church
 Right-wing politics
 Same-sex marriage in France

References 

 

LGBT adoption in Europe
LGBT rights in Europe
Modern history of France
Same-sex marriage in France
2013 in LGBT history
Opposition to same-sex marriage
Conservatism in France